Pusillimonas is a genus of Gram-negative oxidase-positive bacteria of the family Oscillospiraceae. It was formerly included in the family Alcaligenaceae.

References

Oscillospiraceae
Taxa described in 2005